The 2021 Masters Historic Formula One Championship USA was the second season of the Masters Historic Formula One Championship USA. It began at Laguna Seca Raceway on 16 May and will end at Sonoma Raceway on 17 October.

Cars and Drivers

Race results
Bold indicates overall winner.

Championships standings

References

External links

2021
Masters Historic Formula One Championship USA